Boys' time trial was part of the cycling at the 2010 Summer Youth Olympics program. It was held on 18 August 2010 at Tampines Bike Park. This was not an official individual event and therefore medals were not given. However the performance of the athletes provided points towards the Combined Mixed Team event for cycling.

Results 
The race began at approximately 10:00 a.m. (UTC+8) on 18 August at Tampines Bike Park.

References 

 Results

Cycling at the 2010 Summer Youth Olympics
2010 in road cycling